Dukat (Serbian Cyrillic: Дукат) is a mountain in southeastern Serbia, near the town of Bosilegrad.

References

Mountains of Serbia
Rhodope mountain range